Pheron (Ancient Greek: Φηρῶν, Phērōn), mentioned in the Histories by Herodotus, was a king of ancient Egypt. It is probably not his name but the title Pharaoh.

Story 
Pheron had been made blind for ten years after attacking the flooding Nile with a spear. Then he was told the only cure would be to wash his eyes with the urine of a woman who was faithful to her husband. After the urine of several women failed, including his own wife's, he finally found one woman who cured him. Then had the other women burned to death, but he married the one that cured him. Pheron was the son and successor of the legendary conqueror Sesostris. The next in line to the throne after Pheron was Proteus, whose legend ties in with Helen of the Trojan War.

References

Kings of Egypt in Herodotus